Zwivhuya Chris Matombo (born 26 September 1993) is a South African soccer player who plays as a midfielder for Venda.

Career

Matombo started his career with South African top flight side Kaizer Chiefs. In 2015, he signed for Chippa United in South Africa, but left due to disciplinary problems. In 2017, Matombo signed for Maltese second tier club Qormi after receiving interest from Lokeren in the Belgian top flight. In 2018, he signed for Black Leopards in the South African top flight. Before the second half of 2018–19, he signed for South African second tier team TTM.

In 2019, Matombo returned to Qormi in the Maltese second tier. Before the second half of 2020–21, he signed for Maltese top flight outfit Senglea Athletic. In 2021, he signed for Venda in the South African second tier. On 2 October 2021, Matombo debuted for Venda during a 1–0 win over Uthongathi.

References

External links
 Chris Matombo at playmakerstats.com

1993 births

Living people
Association football midfielders
Black Leopards F.C. players
Expatriate footballers in Malta
Kaizer Chiefs F.C. players
Maltese Challenge League players
Maltese Premier League players
National First Division players
Qormi F.C. players
Senglea Athletic F.C. players
South African expatriate soccer players
South African expatriate sportspeople in Malta
South African Premier Division players
South African soccer players
Tshakhuma Tsha Madzivhandila F.C. players